Rayford Whittingham Logan (January 7, 1897 – November 4, 1982) was an African-American historian and Pan-African activist.  He was best known for his study of post-Reconstruction America, a period he termed "the nadir of American race relations". In the late 1940s he was the chief advisor to the National Association for the Advancement of Colored People (NAACP) on international affairs. He was professor emeritus of history at Howard University.

Life
Rayford Logan was born and raised in Washington, DC. He won a scholarship to Williams College, graduating in 1917. During the First World War he joined the U.S. Army, and served as a first lieutenant in the all-black 93rd infantry Division, which undertook operations with French troops. Once the war ended, Logan remained in France, absorbing both the culture and the language. He helped to co-ordinate the 2nd Pan-African Congress in Paris in 1921. He returned to the US in the early 1920s and began teaching at Virginia Union University, a historically black college in Richmond.

During the United States occupation of Haiti, Logan made a fact-finding mission to Haiti to investigate educational efforts and published his findings in The Journal of Negro History in October 1930. The main findings indicated there was little improvement in education due to the choice of Southern white Marines as country administrators – men who had been raised with Jim Crow laws in the American South and had brought their prejudice with them to their new assignment in Haiti, a majority-black republic. The main improvement effort resulted in establishing agricultural schools, which were highly expensive and staffed by non-French speakers, so classes had to be translated. The funding provided to these schools dwarfed the amount given to the majority of academic schools.

In 1930 Logan started graduate studies at Harvard University, earning an MA in 1932 and a Ph.D. in 1936. Logan became a professor at Howard University, where he practiced as a historian from 1938 to 1965.

In 1932, President Franklin D. Roosevelt appointed Logan to his Black Cabinet. Logan drafted Roosevelt's executive order prohibiting the exclusion of blacks from the military in World War II.

In 1950–51, Logan became Director of the Association for the Study of African American Life and History (ASALH).

Logan was the 15th General President of Alpha Phi Alpha, the first intercollegiate Greek-letter fraternity established for African Americans.

Logan died of a heart ailment at Howard University Hospital, aged 85.

Legacy and honors
In 1980, he was awarded the Spingarn Medal from the NAACP.
His longtime residence in the Brookland section of Washington, DC, is a designated site of the city's African-American Heritage Trail.

Selected bibliography
The Betrayal of the Negro (1954/ Collier Books reprint 1965) online
Dictionary of American Negro Biography (updated edition, W. W. Norton, 1982) online
The Negro in the United States (Van Nostrand Co, 1970) online
The Negro in American Life and Thought: The Nadir, 1877–1901 (Dial Press, 1954)
The African Mandates in World Politics (Washington: Public Affairs Press, 1948)
The Senate and the Versailles Mandate System (The Minorities Publishers, 1945; 1975)
The Diplomatic Relations of the United States with Haiti, 1776–1891 (1941; 1969)
Haiti and the Dominican Republic (1968; Oxford University Press) online

References

Further reading

External links

University of Washington
"Rayford W. Logan and the Dilemma of the African American Intellectual". University of Massachusetts Press

1897 births
1982 deaths
20th-century African-American writers
20th-century American historians
20th-century American male writers
African-American male writers
Alpha Phi Alpha presidents
American male non-fiction writers
Harvard University alumni
Historians of race relations
Historians of the United States
Howard University faculty
Spingarn Medal winners
Williams College alumni
Writers from Washington, D.C.